Lingyuan is a city in the west of Liaoning province in Northeast China, bordering Hebei province and Inner Mongolia.

Administrative Divisions
There are eight subdistricts, 11 towns, 10 townships, and one ethnic township under the administration of the city.=

Subdistricts:
Nanjie Subdistrict, Beijie Subdistrict, Chengguan Town Subdistrict, Xingyuan Subdistrict, Dongcheng Subdistrict, Lingbei Subdistrict, Hongshan Subdistrict, Reshuitang Subdistrict

Towns:
Wanyuandian, Songzhangzi, Sanshijiazi, Yangzhangzi, Dao'erdeng, Songlingzi, Siguanyingzi, Goumenzi, Xiaochengzi, Sihedang, Wulanbai

Townships:
Liuzhangzi Township, Sandaohezi Township, Niuyingzi Township, Beilu Township, Hekanzi Township, Dawangzhangzi Township, Foyedong Township, Wafangdian Township, Dahebei Township, Qianjin Township, Sanjiazi Menggu Ethnic Township

Climate

References

External links

County-level divisions of Liaoning
Chaoyang, Liaoning